"St. James Infirmary Blues" is an American blues song and jazz standard of uncertain origin. Louis Armstrong made the song famous in his 1928 recording on which Don Redman was credited as composer; later releases gave the name Joe Primrose, a pseudonym of Irving Mills. The melody is eight bars long, unlike songs in the classic blues genre, where there are 12 bars.

Authorship and history
"St. James Infirmary Blues", sometimes known as "Gambler's Blues", is often regarded as an American folk song of anonymous origin. Moore and Baxter published a version of "Gambler's Blues" in 1925. In 1927, Carl Sandburg published a book called The American Songbag which contained lyrics for two versions of a song called "Those Gambler's Blues". However, the song "St. James Infirmary Blues" is sometimes credited to the songwriter Joe Primrose (a pseudonym for Irving Mills), who held copyrights for several versions of the song, registering the first in 1929. He claimed the rights to this specific title and won a case in the U.S. Supreme Court on this basis, the defendants having failed to produce the documentary evidence required by the court that the song had been known by that name for some years.

"St. James Infirmary Blues" is sometimes said to be based on an eighteenth-century traditional folk song called "The Unfortunate Rake" (also known as "The Unfortunate Lad" or "The Young Man Cut Down in His Prime") about a soldier who uses his money on prostitutes and then dies of venereal disease. But the familiar recorded versions (such as Armstrong's) bear little relation to the older traditional song. The earliest known form of this song was called "The Buck's Elegy" and is set in Covent Garden, London.

According to Robert W. Harwood, A. L. Lloyd was the first person to connect "St. James Infirmary" with "The Unfortunate Lad/Rake". Harwood refers to a five-page article by Lloyd in the January 1947 issue of the English music magazine Keynote. In 1956, Lloyd published a revised version of this article in Sing magazine. In both articles Lloyd refers to an English broadside song entitled "The Unfortunate Lad", commenting that the song is sometimes known as "The Unfortunate Rake". No date or source for the latter title is given. The opening line of this version of the song refers to the "lock hospital", not to an institution named St James. The term "lock hospital" was the name of an institution in Southwark, London, where lepers were isolated and treated. The lock in Southwark was used for those suffering from venereal diseases. The longer term came into use as a generic term for a hospital treating venereal diseases. Its first recorded use is 1770.

Lloyd claims that a song collected by Cecil Sharp in the Appalachians in 1918 which contains the words "St James Hospital" is the parent song and that it looks like an elder relative of "The Dying Cowboy". The opening of that song, as quoted by Lloyd, is:

As I went down by St James Hospital one morning,
So early one morning, it was early one day,
I found my son, my own son,
Wrapped up in white linen, as cold as the clay.

He also claims that this Appalachian version derives in turn from the version published by Such in London in the 1850s which refers to a lock hospital. The opening verse of this song, entitled "The Unfortunate Lad", is:

As I was walking down by the Lock Hospital,
As I was walking one morning of late,
Who did I spy but my own dear comrade,
Wrapp'd up in flannel, so hard was his fate.

Lloyd's articles comment on the jazz hit "St. James Infirmary Blues". The first article asserts that "the song is, or was before it became corrupted, a narrative ballad. Such ballads are rare in Negro song...So doubts are raised about whether 'St. James Infirmary' began life as a Negro song." The second article includes the following comment on the song: "Most versions of 'Infirmary' include a number of stanzas from other songs, grafted on to the main stem – a confusion especially common with songs current among Negroes. The curious switchover from the actual death of the girl to the hypothetical death of the gambler creates some ambiguity too." Lloyd points out that in some early variants of "The Unfortunate Rake" the sex of the victim of venereal disease was female. "We realise that the confusion in the 'Infirmary', where the dead person is a woman but the funeral is ordered for a man, is surely due to the fact that the original ballad was commonly recorded in a form in which the sexes were reversed, so singers were often in two minds whether they were singing of a rakish man or a bad girl."

Lloyd's second article is cited as a reference by Kenneth Goldstein in his liner notes for a 1960 Folkways LP called The Unfortunate Rake. These liner notes are often used as a source for the history of "St. James Infirmary Blues". One example is an article by Rob Walker. The liner notes raise the question of whether St. James' Hospital was a real place and, if so, where it was. Goldstein claimed in the notes that "St. James" refers to London's St. James Hospital, a religious foundation for the treatment of leprosy. His references list an article by Kenneth Lodewick. That article states, giving no reference or source for the idea, that the phrase "St. James Hospital" refers to a hospital of that name in London. There is some difficulty in this because the hospital in question closed in 1532 when Henry VIII acquired the land to build St James's Palace.

Another possibility suggested by Higginbotham on the basis of his claim that the song "St. James Infirmary" dates at least from the early nineteenth century, is the Infirmary section of the St James Workhouse which the St. James Parish opened in 1725 on Poland Street, Soho, and which continued well into the nineteenth century. This St. James Infirmary was contemporaneous with the estimated advent of the song "The Unfortunate Lad", but it is not the London Lock Hospital. Another difficulty is that, out of the early versions of the song mentioned in the references given by Goldstein, only the one collected by Cecil Sharp in the Appalachians in 1918, and one found in Canada in the 1920s, make use of the phrase "St. James".

The liner notes link the Rake to an early fragment called "My Jewel, My Joy", stating that it was heard in Dublin. The same statement appears in the Lodewick article referenced in those notes The notes given in the source cited for this fragment, a collection of songs collected by William Forde and published by P. W. Joyce, state that the song was heard in Cork, not Dublin.

The version of the "Unfortunate Rake" on the LP of that name is sung by Lloyd, of whom it has been said that he "sometimes modified lyrics or melodies to make the songs more palatable for contemporary listeners", and its first verse is as follows:

As I was a-walking down by St. James Hospital,
I was a-walking down by there one day.
What should I spy but one of my comrades
All wrapped up in a flannel though warm was the day.

The liner notes state that Lloyd is singing a nineteenth century broadside version, but do not specify which. The Lloyd article cited in the references given in the liner notes, refers to a version published by Such and to no other version. The title and words sung by Lloyd are not those of the Such broadside which has no reference to St. James and is not called "The Unfortunate Rake". Lloyd recorded a slightly different version in 1966, this time calling the song "St James Hospital". In 1967, his book Folk Song in England was published. This includes some comment on the song, claims without any supporting references or information that a Czech version pre-dates the British ones, repeats the confusion between Dublin and Cork as the place where the "My Jewel My Joy" fragment had been heard, and includes an unattributed quotation of two verses that differ from the versions sung by Lloyd.

Variations typically feature a narrator telling the story of a young man "cut down in his prime" (occasionally, a young woman "cut down in her prime") as a result of morally questionable behaviour. For example, when the song moved to America, gambling and alcohol became common causes of the youth's death.

There are numerous versions of the song throughout the English-speaking world. For example, it evolved into other American standards such as "The Streets of Laredo".

The song, "Dyin' Crapshooter's Blues", has sometimes been described as a descendant of "The Unfortunate Rake", and thus related to "St. James Infirmary Blues". This song was issued as a record four times in 1927, and attributed to pianist, arranger, and band-leader Porter Grainger. Blind Willie McTell recorded a version of the former for John Lomax in 1940 and claimed to have begun writing the song around 1929.

Gottlieb considered whether there were Jewish American influences through the use of the Ukrainian Dorian mode, but only found hints of this in a version published by Siegmeister and Downes. He also suggests that there may have been Jewish influences on the rendition by Cab Calloway.  A melody very similar to the Armstrong version can be found in an instrumental composition entitled "Charleston Cabin", which was recorded by Whitey Kaufman's Original Pennsylvania Serenaders in 1924 (three years before the earliest recording of "Gambler's Blues"). This seems to be the earliest known occurrence of the tune; it alternates with a major key melody reminiscent of Swanee River, opening the possibility that St. James Infirmary may be a chromatic transformation of this. 

As with many folk songs, there is much variation in the lyric from one version to another. These are the first two stanzas as sung by Louis Armstrong on a 1928 Odeon Records release:

I went down to St. James Infirmary,
Saw my baby there,
Stretched out on a long white table,
So cold, so sweet, so fair.

Let her go, let her go, God bless her,
Wherever she may be,
She can look this wide world over,
But she'll never find a sweet man like me.

Some of the versions, such as the one published as "Gambler's Blues" and attributed to Carl Moore and Phil Baxter, frame the story with an initial stanza or stanzas in which a separate narrator goes down to a saloon known as "Joe's barroom" and encounters a customer who then relates the incident about the woman in the infirmary. Later verses commonly include the speaker's request to be buried according to certain instructions, which vary according to the version. Armstrong's version includes the following as its third stanza:

When I die, want you to dress me, straight-lace shoes,
Box-back coat and a Stetson hat.
Put a twenty-dollar gold piece on my watch chain,
So the boys'll know that I died standin' pat.

Other versions
 

The song was first recorded (as "Gambler's Blues") in 1927 by Fess Williams and his Royal Flush Orchestra with credits given to Moore and Baxter. This version mentions an infirmary but not by name. The song was popular during the jazz era, and by 1930 at least eighteen different versions had been released. The Duke Ellington Orchestra recorded the song using pseudonyms such as "The Ten Black Berries", "The Harlem Hot Chocolates", and "The Jungle Band", while Cab Calloway performed a version in the 1933 Betty Boop animated film Snow White, providing vocals and dance moves for Koko the clown.

Country music singer and yodeller Jimmie Rodgers recorded a version in 1930 (as "Those Gambler's Blues"). In 1932 Rodgers recorded "Gambling Bar Room Blues", co-written with Shelly Lee Alley, which featured new lyrics but followed a similar melody to "St. James Infirmary Blues", with similar themes of alcohol abuse, violence and despair. Cajun string band the Dixie Ramblers recorded "Barroom Blues" in 1935, with lyrics largely matching Rodgers' "Those Gambler's Blues". 

In 1961, Bobby "Blue" Bland released a version of "Saint James Infirmary" on the flip side of his No. 2 R&B hit "Don't Cry No More" and included it in his album Two Steps from the Blues. In 1967, the French-American singer Joe Dassin recorded the song. In 1968, Don Partridge released a version on his self-named album, as did Eric Burdon and the Animals on their album Every One of Us. Dock Boggs recorded a version of the song entitled "Old Joe's Barroom" (1965).

The song was often performed by cabaret surrealists The Mystic Knights of the Oingo Boingo in Southern California; the band's vocalist and songwriter, Danny Elfman, often cited Cab Calloway as his inspiration in his youth. The White Stripes covered the song on their self-titled debut album, and Jack White says he and fellow band member, Meg White, were introduced to the song from the Betty Boop cartoon. In 1981, Bob Dylan adapted the song when he wrote and recorded "Blind Willie McTell". The song was written for his 1983 release, Infidels, but was not released until The Bootleg Series, Vol. 1-3: Rare and Unreleased, 1961-1991 (Columbia, 1991).
In 2012, Trombone Shorty and Booker T. Jones performed an instrumental version as the opening number of the "Red, White, and Blues" concert at the White House.

Other performers include:

 The Hokum Boys - Gambler's Blues (1929)
 Artie Shaw and His Orchestra, with Hot Lips Page providing vocals (1941)
 Josh White (1944)
 Turk Murphy (1951)
 Johnny Duncan - Johnny Duncan's Tennessee Song Bag (1958)
 Snooks Eaglin – New Orleans Street Singer (Folkways, 1959)
 Dave Van Ronk - "Gambler's Blues", on Dave Van Ronk Sings Ballads, Blues, and a Spiritual (1959)
 Lou Rawls – Black and Blue (1963)
 Colette Magny - "St. James Infirmary Blues" (1964)
 The Standells – Try It (1967)
 Joe Dassin – St. James Infirmary Blues (1967)
 Jerry Reed - Jerry Reed Explores Country Guitar (1969)
 Joe Cocker – Joe Cocker (1972)
 Geordie - "Goin' Down", on Don't Be Fooled by the Name (1974)
Lily Tomlin - Saturday Night Live (1975)
 Canadian Brass – Basin Street (1984)
Doc Watson and Richard Watson – Third Generation Blues (1999)
Toshiyuki Honda – Metropolis original motion picture soundtrack (2001)
 Isobel Campbell and Mark Lanegan (2005)
 The Devil Makes Three – A Little Bit Faster and a Little Bit Worse (under the title St James) (2006)
Arlo Guthrie with the University of Kentucky Symphony Orchestra – In Times Like These (2007)
Rising Appalachia – The Sails of Self (2010)
 Hugh Laurie – Let Them Talk (2011)
 Rickie Lee Jones – The Devil You Know (2012)
 Dalice Marie – Twenty Eight (2016)
 Yo-Yo Ma's Silkroad Ensemble with Rhiannon Giddens – Sing Me Home (2016)
 Jon Batiste – Hollywood Africans (2018)
 Liquor Beats Winter - Lost In The Sauce (2018)

See also
List of pre-1920 jazz standards

Notes

References

External links
 Historical investigation by Rob Walker
 "St. James Infirmary Blues" recordings collection
 "St. James Infirmary (1928)" at jazzstandards.com
 Betty Boop cartoon includes a performance by Cab Calloway
 "The magical mystery tour" by Sarah Vowell at Salon. 6 October 1999.
 Metropolis performance by Toshiyuki Honda
 "Cab Calloway — St James Infirmary Blues"  tweeted by Armie Hammer on Twitter, September 5, 2019.
 Blog devoted to "St. James Infirmary Blues" by Robert W. Harwood

American folk songs
Jazz standards of obscure origin
Year of song unknown
Bobby Bland songs
Cab Calloway songs
Harry Connick Jr. songs
Joe Cocker songs
Louis Armstrong songs
Songs with lyrics by Irving Mills